The Most Beautiful Boy in the World is a 2021 Swedish documentary film about Björn Andrésen and the effects of fame thrust upon him when he appeared in Luchino Visconti's 1971 film Death in Venice. Andrésen was just 16 when the film came out, and was unprepared for instantly becoming an international celebrity.

The title of the documentary derives from a remark that Visconti made about Andrésen at the premiere of Death in Venice in London.

The Most Beautiful Boy in the World premiered at the 2021 Sundance Film Festival on January 29, 2021. It received a nomination for the World Cinema Documentary Grand Jury Prize at the festival. The film was released in US theaters on September 24, 2021.

Reception

Critical response
On Rotten Tomatoes, the documentary holds an approval rating of 79% based on 50 reviews, with an average rating of 7.1/10.

See also

References

External links
 
 
 
 

2021 documentary films
2021 films
American documentary films
2020s American films